Charaxes viola, the savanna demon charaxes, is a butterfly in the family Nymphalidae. It is found in Senegal, Gambia, Guinea-Bissau, Guinea, Burkina Faso, Sierra Leone, Ivory Coast, Ghana, Togo, Nigeria, Chad, Cameroon, the Republic of the Congo, the Central African Republic, Chad, the Democratic Republic of the Congo, Sudan, Uganda and Kenya. The habitat consists of dry savanna and dry forests.

Adults are attracted to fallen mangoes.

The larvae feed on Entada gigas, Acacia mellifera, Albizia adianthifolia, Albizia coriaria, Entada abyssinica, Acacia amythethophylla, Albizia gummifera and Entada sudanica.

Description

Female. Upperside — front wings brown; outer margin reddish; a broad ferruginous band near the hind margin, interrupted above by a brown patch and by the nervures. Hindwings, basal half brown, apical half white tinted with blue green; outer margin brown, with orange upper edging, green below the outer tail; a submarginal row of violaceous lunules; two black spots at the anal angle. Underside only differs from C. ethalion in the brighter red of the submarginal lunules, in the central white band being only indicated by a paler shade of brown, and the less distinct black markings.

Taxonomy
Charaxes viola is a member of the large species group Charaxes etheocles.

Subspecies
Charaxes viola viola (Senegal, Gambia, Guinea-Bissau, Guinea, Burkina Faso, Sierra Leone, Ivory Coast, Ghana, Togo, western and northern Nigeria, Cameroon, Chad)
Charaxes viola picta van Someren & Jackson, 1952 (eastern Nigeria, mountains of Cameroon, Congo, Central African Republic, north-eastern Democratic Republic of the Congo, southern Sudan, northern Uganda, north-western Kenya)

References

Victor Gurney Logan Van Someren, 1969 Revisional notes on African Charaxes (Lepidoptera: Nymphalidae). Part V. Bulletin of the British Museum (Natural History) (Entomology) 75-166.

External links
Charaxes viola diversiforma viridicaerulea Royal Museum for Central Africa
Images of C. viola picta Royal Museum for Central Africa (Albertine Rift Project)
Images of C. viola diversiforma Albertine Rift Project)
Images of Charaxes viola at Bold
Bold images of Charaxes viola diversiforma 
Bold images of Charaxes viola picta 
Bold images Charaxes viola viola

Butterflies described in 1866
viola
Butterflies of Africa
Taxa named by Arthur Gardiner Butler